SBS FunE (stylised SBS funE, formerly UTV, E! and SBS E!) is a South Korean cable and satellite television channel owned by SBS.

Launched as UTV on August 16, 2005, it became E! on January 1, 2009 after an agreement between SBS and Comcast on September 5, 2008. Using the E! brand under license from Comcast, its programming consisted of mostly those from E! U.S., but also carried programs from the South Korean counterpart, as well as the libraries of SBS. Number of programs from E! have been dropped since then.

The channel officially renamed to SBS E! on November 1, 2011, retaining only the red E! logo. The channel became SBS funE on January 1, 2014, completely dropping the Comcast-owned brand.

References

Logo

External links
 

funE
Television channels in South Korea
Korean-language television stations
Television channels and stations established in 2005